Lal Darwaza (Red Gate) is one of the old suburbs or Inner City in Hyderabad, India.

History 
Lal Darwaza was built in 1907. Prime Minister of Nizam government Maharaja Kishan Pershad started the Bonalu festival from this temple. The Nizam of Hyderabad Mir Mahbub Ali Khan gave donations and land to this and many other temples.

A large red door at the entrance to this suburb was named Lal darwaza (Red Door) during the time of the Nizams.

Culture 
Bonala Jathara ("Procession" in English) at Lal Darwaza is considered the biggest cultural festival in Telangana.

Geography 
It is a kilometer from Charminar (1.5 km), Koti (4 km), Afzalgunj (3 km), CBS (Central Bus Station-IMLIBAN) (3 km), Chandrayangutta (1.5 km), Uppuguda (0.5 km) With the surroundings Aliyabad, Chatrinaka, Gowlipura, Rajannabai, Shalibanda.

Earlier a Sufi Dargah with a writing engraved "Pather ki Dargha" ("Stone Mausoleum" in English) was found in Lal Darwaza.

Commercial area
Many shops are present. A movie theater Sudha 70MM; now known as Cinepolis is located there.

Transport
Lal Darwaza is connected to other towns by TSRTC buses. A Bus Depot is nearby.  The closest MMTS is at Uppuguda.

References

Neighbourhoods in Hyderabad, India